Callum Ross (born 15 September 1994) is an English semi-professional footballer who plays as a midfielder for Spennymoor Town.

Career

Early career
Ross started his football career with local side Cramlington Juniors. After a spell training with both Newcastle United and Sunderland, he signed for the latter, spending three years with the club before returning to Cramlington. He then attended Monkseaton High School before accepting an offer to study at Wingate University.

College
Ross played four years of college soccer at Wingate University between 2013 and 2016, although Ross missed the majority of the 2014 season due to injury. Ross helped guide Wingate University to its first ever division 2 national title in 2016.

Professional career
Ross signed with United Soccer League club Charlotte Independence 21 February 2017. He made his professional debut on 1 April 2017, starting in a 2–0 loss to Charleston Battery.

Ross signed with OKC Energy FC on 2 January 2018 for the 2018 season.

He returned to England and signed for South Shields in January 2020.

In January 2023, Ross joined National League North side Spennymoor Town for an undisclosed fee, signing an 18-month deal.

References

External links
Profile at South Shields
South Shields stats

1994 births
Living people
English footballers
Association football midfielders
Charlotte Independence players
OKC Energy FC players
South Shields F.C. (1974) players
Spennymoor Town F.C. players
USL Championship players
Northern Premier League players
English expatriate footballers
Expatriate soccer players in the United States
English expatriate sportspeople in the United States